In algebraic geometry, given a smooth projective curve X over a finite field  and a smooth affine group scheme G over it, the moduli stack of principal bundles over X, denoted by , is an algebraic stack given by: for any -algebra R,
 the category of principal G-bundles over the relative curve .

Similarly,  can also be defined when the curve X is over the field of complex numbers. Roughly, in the complex case, one can define  as the quotient stack of the space of holomorphic connections on X by the gauge group.

Basic properties 
It is known that  is a smooth stack of dimension  where  is the genus of X. It is not of finite type but locally of finite type; one thus usually uses a stratification by open substacks of finite type (cf. the Harder–Narasimhan stratification.) If G is a split reductive group, then the set of connected components  is in a natural bijection with the fundamental group .

The Atiyah–Bott formula

Behrend's trace formula 

This is a (conjectural) version of the Lefschetz trace formula for  when X is over a finite field, introduced by Behrend in 1993. It states: if G is a smooth affine group scheme with semisimple connected generic fiber, then

where (see also Behrend's trace formula for the details)
 is the geometric Frobenius.
, the sum running over all isomorphism classes of G-bundles on X and convergent.
 for a graded vector space , provided the series on the right absolutely converges.
A priori, neither left nor right side in the formula converges. Thus, the formula states that the two sides converge to finite numbers and that those numbers coincide.

Notes

References 
J. Heinloth, Lectures on the moduli stack of vector bundles on a curve, 2009 preliminary version
J. Heinloth, A.H.W. Schmitt, The Cohomology Ring of Moduli Stacks of Principal Bundles over Curves, 2010 preprint, available at http://www.uni-essen.de/~hm0002/.
 Gaitsgory, D; Lurie, J.; Weil's Conjecture for Function Fields. 2014,

Further reading 
Tamagawa number for functional fields
C. Sorger, Lectures on moduli of principal G-bundles over algebraic curves

See also 
Geometric Langlands conjectures
Ran space
Moduli stack of vector bundles

Algebraic geometry